George Blackburn (born 1888) was a professional footballer, who played for Bradford Park Avenue and Huddersfield Town.

References

1888 births
Year of death missing
Footballers from Worksop
English footballers
Association football midfielders
English Football League players
Bradford (Park Avenue) A.F.C. players
Huddersfield Town A.F.C. players